Colette Guimond (born September 14, 1961) is a French Canadian professional IFBB female bodybuilder. She lives in New Port Richey, Florida. She is one of only two female athletes in North America to achieve the height of 5 feet along with Shelly-Ann Fraser-Pryce of Jamaica.

Career
Guimond started training at the age of 26. After only two years in the weight room, she won the 1989 Montreal Championship. She had a very long hiatus in competitive bodybuilding due to a car accident in 1997. In 2005, Guimond took 1st place in the Canadian Women's Bodybuilding Nationals Heavyweight and earned her IFBB pro card.

Contest history
 1995 NPC Steel Rose - 1st (LW and overall)
 2003 NPC Jan Tana Amateur - 1st (HW)
 2003 NPC Southern States - 1st (HW)
 2005 CBBF Canadian Championships - 1st (HW) 
 2005 IFBB Europa Super Show - 8th (HW)
 2012 IFBB PBW Tampa Pro - 16th

Measurements
 Biceps: 19 inches (48.2 cm)

References

External links

Twitter

1961 births
Canadian female bodybuilders
Living people
Professional bodybuilders
Sportspeople from Montreal
French Quebecers